France–Portugal relations are the current and historical relations between France and Portugal. Both nations are members of the Council of Europe, European Union, NATO, Organisation for Economic Co-operation and Development, Union for the Mediterranean and the United Nations.

History
France and Portugal have a long history of relations given the proximity between both nations. Afonso I of Portugal, the founding monarch of the Kingdom of Portugal, was an agnatic descendant of the French House of Burgundy, itself a cadet branch of the influential Capetian dynasty. Both nations would become two of the largest global empires, with both the French colonial empire and the Portuguese empire competing against each other in their quest to expand their respective empires. In 1495, France and Portugal signed a Treaty of Alliance and Trade, the first between both nations.

Between 1640 and 1668, France sided with Portugal during the Portuguese Restoration War against Spain. However, during the Seven Years' War, both nations were on opposing sides during the conflict. Both France and Portugal were on opposing sides during the War of the Spanish Succession and again during the Spanish invasion of Portugal of 1762.

Relations between France and Portugal came to a low when in 1807, Portugal refused French Emperor Napoleon Bonaparte's demand to accede to the Continental System of embargo against the United Kingdom. Soon afterwards, a French invasion under General Jean-Andoche Junot followed, and the Portuguese capital of Lisbon was captured on 8 December 1807. As a result of the impending French invasion, the Portuguese monarchy transferred its court to Rio de Janeiro in Brazil. Rio de Janeiro would remain the capital of Portugal and the empire between 1808 and 1821. Lisbon regained its status as the capital of Portugal when Brazil declared its independence from Portugal in 1822.

British intervention in the Peninsular War helped in maintaining Portuguese independence; the last French troops were expelled in 1812. The war cost Portugal the town of Olivença, which is now governed by Spain.

During World War I, Portugal remained neutral, however, in 1916 it became an associated member to the allied forces (which included France). During World War II, Portugal remained neutral throughout the war.

Political relations between France and Portugal remain close. Both nations are members of the European Union and work closely together on numerous issues. France is host to the largest Portuguese diaspora community in Europe with approximately 1.7 million Portuguese citizens living in France, and making Portugal the largest foreign community in France.

Resident diplomatic missions
 France has an embassy in Lisbon.
 Portugal has an embassy in Paris and consulates-general in Bordeaux, Lyon, Marseille, Strasbourg and a vice-consulate in Toulouse.

See also
 Portuguese in France

References